Panzhousaurus is an extinct genus of pachypleurosaur from the Middle Triassic of China. The type species is P. rotundirostris.

References 

Pachypleurosaurs
Middle Triassic reptiles of Asia
Triassic China
Fossils of China
Sauropterygian genera
Fossil taxa described in 2019